The Lautaro Special Operations Brigade (Brigada de Operaciones Especiales "Lautaro," BOE) is a Special operations formation of the Chilean Army. It is made up of units of special forces, land, mountain and paratroopers, commandos, tactical divers, and snipers. 

To create the brigade, Infantry Regiment No. 22 "Lautaro" and the Group of Armored Cavalry No. 4 Cuirassiers had to be closed. "Army opens rapid deployment elite brigade" , El Mercurio, December 25, 2006; accessed December 12, 2008. 

Among its reported units are the 1st Parachute Battalion "Pelantaru"; the 1st Commandos Company "Iquique;" the 10th Commandos Company; the 13th Commandos Company "Escorpión;" and the Grupo Especial de Montaña (Special Mountain Group). In 2010 the IISS Military Balance said the Chilean Army had one special operations brigade with four battalions.

References 

Military special forces brigades
Military units and formations of Chile
Military units and formations established in 2006